One Touch of Nature is a 1917 American silent comedy film directed by Edward H. Griffith and starring John Drew Bennett, Viola Cain and Edward O'Connor.

Cast
 John Drew Bennett as William Vandervoort Cosgrove
 Viola Cain as Madame de Montignon
 Edward O'Connor as Shamus O'Brien
 John Henry as Old Man Cosgrove
 Helen Strickland as Mrs. Cosgrove
 John J. McGraw as Self

References

Bibliography
 Robert B. Connelly. The Silents: Silent Feature Films, 1910-36, Volume 40, Issue 2. December Press, 1998.

External links
 

1917 films
1917 comedy films
1910s English-language films
American silent feature films
Silent American comedy films
American black-and-white films
Films directed by Edward H. Griffith
Edison Studios films
1910s American films